Cosmogonia is a genus of moths in the family Geometridae.

Species
 Cosmogonia decorata (Warren, 1896)

References
 Cosmogonia at Markku Savela's Lepidoptera and Some Other Life Forms
 Natural History Museum Lepidoptera genus database

Geometrinae